Eduardo Rodrigues Souza (born September 20, 1991 in Guararapes), known as Dudu, is a centre forward raised by Flamengo in Brazil. He is currently playing for São Gonçalo Esporte Clube.

Career
The young Dudu was considered a promising talent when playing in the junior squads of Flamengo, but was not rewarded with a contract and ended up with Corinthians Alagoano (not to be confused with the more illustrious Corinthians of São Paulo). He then went on loan to Beira-Mar in Portugal.

References

External links
  
 Dudu at ZeroZero
 
 

Living people
Brazilian footballers
1991 births
People from Araçatuba
Sport Club Corinthians Alagoano players
S.C. Beira-Mar players
Rio Claro Futebol Clube players
Bonsucesso Futebol Clube players
Clube de Regatas Brasil players
Tupi Football Club players
Bangu Atlético Clube players
NK Dugopolje players
Primeira Liga players
First Football League (Croatia) players
Association football forwards
Expatriate footballers in Croatia
Expatriate footballers in Portugal
Brazilian expatriate sportspeople in Portugal
Brazilian expatriate sportspeople in Croatia
Footballers from São Paulo (state)